2015–16 Jordan League Division 1 featured 10 teams from the 2015–16 campaign, two new teams relegated from the 2015–16 Premier League: Al-Asalah and Kufrsoum, and two new teams promoted from the 2015–16 Jordan League Division 2: Al-Wahda and Al-Karmel. The season started on 27 February 2017.

Al-Aqaba won the league title and promoted to 2017–18 Jordan League along with Al-Yarmouk. Al-Sarhan and Al-Taiba were relegated to the 2017–18 Jordan League Division 2.

Teams
Teams relegated from the 2015–16 Premier League
Al-Asalah
Kufrsoum

Teams promoted from the 2014–15 Jordan League Division 2
Al-Wahda
Al-Karmel

Stadiums and locations

League table

References

 
 

Jordan
2016–17 in Jordanian football